Pterocarpus is a pantropical genus of trees in the family Fabaceae. It belongs to the subfamily Faboideae, and was recently assigned to the informal monophyletic Pterocarpus clade within the Dalbergieae. Most species of Pterocarpus yield valuable timber traded as padauk (or padouk); other common names are mukwa or narra. P. santalinus also yields the most precious red sandalwood in China known as Zitan. The wood from the narra tree (P. indicus) and the Burmese padauk tree (P. macrocarpus) is marketed as amboyna when it has grown in the burl form. The scientific name is Latinized Ancient Greek and means "wing fruit", referring to the unusual shape of the seed pods in this genus.

Uses
Padauk wood is obtained from several species of Pterocarpus. All padauks are of African or Asian origin. Padauks are valued for their toughness, stability in use, and decorativeness, most having a reddish wood. Most Pterocarpus woods contain either water- or alcohol-soluble substances and can be used as dyes.

The padauk found most often is African padauk from P. soyauxii which, when freshly cut, is a very bright red/orange but when exposed to sunlight fades over time to a warm brown. Its colour makes it a favourite among woodworkers. Burmese padauk (ပိတောက်) is P. macrocarpus while Andaman padauk is P. dalbergioides. Padauks can be confused with true rosewoods to which they are somewhat related, but as a general rule padauks are coarser and less decorative in figure. Like rosewood, padauk is sometimes used to make xylophone, organ and marimba keys, and guitars. It is an important material in traditional Chinese furniture.

Some padauks, e.g. P. soyauxii, are used as herbal medicines, for example to treat skin parasites and fungal infections.

Chemistry
Pterocarpin is a pterocarpan found in Pterocarpus spp.

Species
A total of 35 species is currently accepted:

 Pterocarpus acapulcensis Rose

 Pterocarpus albopubescens Hauman

 Pterocarpus amazonum (Benth.) Amshoff

 Pterocarpus angolensis DC.—kiaat
 Pterocarpus antunesii (Taub.) Harms

 Pterocarpus brenanii Barbosa & Torre

 Pterocarpus claessensii De Wild.

 Pterocarpus dalbergioides DC.—Andaman padauk, Andaman redwood, East Indian mahogany

 Pterocarpus echinatus Pers.
 Pterocarpus erinaceus Poir.—muninga, barwood, vène

 Pterocarpus gilletii De Wild.

 Pterocarpus hockii De Wild.

 Pterocarpus homblei De Wild.

 Pterocarpus indicus Willd.—Pashu padauk, Malay padauk, New Guinea rosewood

 Pterocarpus lucens Guill. & Perr.

 Pterocarpus macrocarpus Kurz—Burmese padauk

 Pterocarpus marsupium Roxb.—Indian kino, Malabar kino, benga, bijiayasal (w Nepal), venkai

 Pterocarpus mildbraedii Harms

 Pterocarpus mutondo De Wild.

 Pterocarpus officinalis Jacq.
 Pterocarpus orbiculatus DC.

 Pterocarpus osun Craib

 Pterocarpus rohrii Vahl
 Pterocarpus rotundifolius (Sond.) Druce
 subsp. polyanthus (Harms) Mendonça & E. P. Sousa
 var. martinii (Dunkley) Mendonça & E. P. Sousa
 var. polyanthus (Harms) Mendonça & E. P. Sousa
 subsp. rotundifolius (Sond.) Druce

 Pterocarpus santalinoides DC.—mututi
 Pterocarpus santalinus L. f.—red sandalwood, red sanders

 Pterocarpus soyauxii Taub.—African padauk, African coralwood

 Pterocarpus ternatus Rizzini
 Pterocarpus tessmannii Harms
 Pterocarpus tinctorius Welw.

 Pterocarpus velutinus De Wild.

 Pterocarpus villosus (Benth.) Benth.
 Pterocarpus violaceus Vogel

 Pterocarpus zehntneri Harms
 Pterocarpus zenkeri Harms

Notes
 Some sources treat P. echinatus as a synonym of P. indicus.

References

External links

 
Fabaceae genera
Medicinal plants
Pantropical flora
Taxa named by Nikolaus Joseph von Jacquin